The Toronto Maple Leafs were a professional box lacrosse team in the National Lacrosse Association.  The team started out in the senior A league in 1966.  In 1968, the professional NLA was launched and the Maple Leafs joined the league, playing their home games at Maple Leaf Gardens.  Stafford Smythe and Harold Ballard, part owners of the National Hockey League's Toronto Maple Leafs, were two of the five founding partners of the pro club, but financial difficulties forced Maple Leaf Gardens Ltd. to take over ownership of the club midway through the season.  The NLA suspended operations prior to the following season.  However, the eastern division of the NLA reconstituted itself as the Eastern Professional Lacrosse Association, in which the Maple Leafs competed in 1969.  By 1970 the pro league had disbanded.  Toronto would be without pro box lacrosse until the arrival of the Toronto Tomahawks in 1974.

References

Maple Leafs
Maple Leaf Sports & Entertainment
1966 establishments in Ontario
Lacrosse clubs established in 1966